The Workplace Hazardous Materials Bureau (Workplace Hazardous Materials Information System) operates through the federal government department of Health Canada.  Located in Ottawa, Ontario, Canada, the National Office of the Workplace Hazardous Materials Information System serves as the national coordinator for the governance and administration in Canada. Also, the office is the national secretariat for this federal, provincial and territorial government partnership program.

The National Office of Workplace Hazardous Materials Information System is divided into two sections:
 public awareness, surveillance and national compliance coordination
 legislative, regulatory and international affairs

External links
Seeking Information from the National Office of WHMIS and from the Federal, Provincial and Territorial Occupational Health and Safety Regulatory Agencies
Subscribe to WHMIS News

Health Canada
Government agencies with year of establishment missing
Organizations based in Ottawa
Occupational safety and health